Stéphanos II Ghattas  (January 16, 1920 – January 20, 2009), was an eparch of the Coptic Catholic Church. From 1986 to 2006 he served as the Coptic Catholic Patriarch of Alexandria. He was also a Cardinal. His canonization process has been initiated.

Biography
Ghattas was born Andraos Ghattas in the village of Cheikh Zein-el-Dine in the Girga Governorate (now part of the Sohag Governorate), Egypt. Feeling called to serve as a priest, as a teenager he entered the minor seminary of the Coptic Church in Cairo, then did studies at a Jesuit secondary school in the city. He then went to Rome, where he studied at the Pontifical Urbaniana University, earning doctorates in both theology and philosophy. He was ordained there on March 25, 1944. He then returned to Egypt where he taught at Coptic seminaries in the country, first at Tahta, then at Tanta.

In 1952 Ghattas entered the Congregation of the Mission, doing his year of novitiate in France. He then served in the Lebanon for six years, after which he was sent to Alexandria, where he was the Superior of the Vincentians in Egypt. He was chosen to be the Coptic Bishop of Luxor on 8 May 1967 and consecrated on 9 June 1967 in Alexandria by Cardinal Stéphanos I Sidarouss, Coptic Patriarch of Alexandria. He was elected patriarch himself on June 8, 1986. Pope John Paul II granted him the ecclesiastica communio on June 23, 1986.

Pope John Paul II named him a cardinal of the Catholic Church in 2001. As he was past the legal age of 80 at the time, however, he was unable to participate in the Conclave of 2005.

Ghattas retired from the patriarchal office in March 2006, and his successor, Antonios Naguib, was elected on March 30, 2006.

Ghattas died in Cairo, where he had retired, on January 20, 2009, four days after his 89th birthday, and was buried in the Cathedral of Our Lady of Egypt in Cairo.

See also
List of Coptic Catholic Patriarchs of Alexandria

Notes

External links 
 Cardinal Ghattas

1920 births
2009 deaths
Cardinals created by Pope John Paul II
People from Sohag Governorate
Vincentians
Pontifical Urban University alumni
Vincentian bishops
Coptic Catholic Patriarchs of Alexandria
20th-century Eastern Catholic archbishops
21st-century Eastern Catholic archbishops
Egyptian cardinals
Vincentian cardinals
Burials in Egypt
People from Luxor
People from Bethlehem
21st-century venerated Christians
Coptic Catholic bishops